Mihajlo Mladenovikj (born 21 September 2000) is a Serbian-born Macedonian handball player who plays for GRK Ohrid and the Macedonian national team.

References

https://www.minisel.gov.mk/featured_item/mihajlo-mladenovik/
https://24rakomet.mk/%d0%b1%d1%80%d0%b5%d1%81%d1%82%d0%be%d0%b2%d0%b0%d1%86-%d1%81%d0%be-%d0%b4%d0%b2%d0%b5-%d0%b8%d0%b7%d0%bc%d0%b5%d0%bd%d0%b8-%d0%b7%d0%b0-%d0%b2%d1%82%d0%be%d1%80%d0%b8%d0%be%d1%82-%d0%bc%d0%b5%d1%87/
https://24rakomet.mk/%d0%bc%d0%b5%d1%82%d0%b0%d0%bb%d1%83%d1%80%d0%b3-%d0%b3%d0%b8-%d0%be%d1%82%d1%81%d1%82%d0%b0%d0%bf%d0%b8-%d0%b1%d0%b5%d0%ba%d0%be%d0%b2%d0%b8%d1%82%d0%b5-%d0%bc%d0%bb%d0%b0%d0%b4%d0%b5%d0%bd/
https://24rakomet.mk/%d0%b4%d0%be%d0%b4%d0%b8%d1%9c-%d0%b8-%d0%bc%d0%bb%d0%b0%d0%b4%d0%b5%d0%bd%d0%be%d0%b2%d0%b8%d1%9c-%d0%b3%d0%be-%d0%b7%d0%b0%d1%81%d0%b8%d0%bb%d0%b8%d1%98%d0%b0-%d0%b0%d0%b5%d1%80%d0%be%d0%b4%d1%80/
http://www.g-sport.mk/vest-statija/91275/metalurg-oslobodi-dvajca-rakometari

2000 births
Living people
Macedonian male handball players
People from Vranje
Mediterranean Games competitors for North Macedonia
Competitors at the 2022 Mediterranean Games